This is a list of hills in the North Pennines. To avoid the list becoming infinitely long and arbitrary, only hills with more than 30 m relative height are included. This includes all Marilyns and Hewitts as well as many other hills.

Topographically, the boundaries of the North Pennines trace the flow of streams from the lowest points between it and the neighbouring regions of the Lake District, Cheviots and Yorkshire Dales. This gives the boundaries as, primarily, the River Eden, River Tyne, River Tees and River Greta (from Stainmore Gap). This list therefore includes all hills to the east of the North Pennines including the low hills of County Durham.

Hills are grouped as topographically as possible, according to their 'parent Marilyn'. The parent Marilyn of hill A can be found by dividing the nearby area into territories, by tracing the runoff from the key col of each Marilyn. The parent is the Marilyn whose territory hill A resides in. Marilyns are given in bold.

In the table headers, H stands for height and RH for relative height.

See also
List of hills in the Lake District
List of hills in the Yorkshire Dales
List of hills in the Peak District

North Pennines
North Pennines